George James "Red" Sullivan (December 24, 1929 – January 19, 2019) was a Canadian professional ice hockey player who played in the National Hockey League (NHL) from 1949 to 1961. After finishing his playing career Sullivan became a coach, serving in that role between 1962 and 1975.

Playing career
George "Red" Sullivan began his NHL career with the Boston Bruins (1949–1953). He also played for the Chicago Black Hawks (1954–1956) and the New York Rangers (1956–1961).  

Sullivan led the Chicago Black Hawks in scoring in the two years he played with them.  

Sullivan was severely injured, and very nearly killed, when defenceman Doug Harvey of the Montreal Canadiens speared him in the stomach, rupturing his spleen, where a Catholic priest was even brought to the hospital to deliver his last rites, however Sullivan survived and resumed his career with the New York Rangers.

During 556 NHL games, he scored 107 goals with 239 assists for 346 points.

In the 2009 book 100 Ranger Greats, the authors ranked Sullivan at No. 66 all-time of the 901 New York Rangers who had played during the team's first 82 seasons.

Coaching career
Sullivan became the head coach of the Rangers during the 1962–63 season when fans began to demand Muzz Patrick resign. He coached a rather bad team until December 1965 when the Rangers' general manager, Emile Francis decided he himself would take over as head coach.

Sullivan then coached the Pittsburgh Penguins in their first season. He was dismissed on March 31, 1969 after two consecutive seasons of the Penguins failing to qualify for the playoffs due to a pair of fifth-place finishes.

During the 1974-1975 NHL season, Sullivan replaced Jim Anderson as head coach of the expansion Washington Capitals. Sullivan posted a 2-16 record as head coach and was replaced later that season by Milt Schmidt.

He died on January 19, 2019, after suffering for a number of years with Alzheimer's / dementia.

Career statistics

Regular season and playoffs

Coaching record

References

External links
 

1929 births
2019 deaths
Baltimore Clippers players
Boston Bruins players
Boston Bruins scouts
Canadian ice hockey centres
Canadian people of Irish descent
Chicago Blackhawks players
Hershey Bears players
Ice hockey people from Ontario
Kitchener Beavers (EPHL) players
New York Rangers coaches
New York Rangers players
Philadelphia Flyers scouts
Pittsburgh Penguins coaches
Pittsburgh Penguins scouts
St. Catharines Teepees players
Sportspeople from Peterborough, Ontario
Washington Capitals coaches
Washington Capitals scouts